Edna Anne Wheeler Ballard, also known as Lotus Ray King (June 25, 1886 - February 10, 1971), was an American theosopher who co-founded the Saint Germain Foundation and served a co-leader of the I AM Movement with her husband, Guy Ballard. In 1944, Ballard and her son, Donald Ballard, were charged with mail fraud and their court case would eventually be ruled by the US Supreme Court as United States v. Ballard. Ballard's work with the I AM Movement is considered a predecessor to the current new age movement.

Early life and education

Edna Anne Wheeler was born in 1886 in Burlington, Iowa. Her mother was Anna Hewitt Pearce and her father was Edward G. Wheeler, a railway clerk. Ballard became a concert harpist in 1912. In 1916, Ballard married Guy W. Ballard. Two years later, in 1918, she had a child with Guy, named Donald.

I AM Movement

The couple resided in Chicago, Illinois. Ballard began working at the Philosopher's Nook, an occult bookstore. She also served as an editor of American Occultists.  Guy was also interested in the occult,  and while hiking at Mount Shasta in California in September 1931 he met an individual who claimed to be St. Germain. Ballard called Saint Germain an "ascended master." Guy wrote back to Ballard, telling her about his interaction(s) with St. Germain. In 1931, the couple founded the Saint Germain Foundation and Saint Germain Press in Chicago. The called the umbrella over the two organizations the I AM Movement.

Ballard's role within the Movement was as "accredited messenger of the ascended masters," alongside Guy. However, Ballard eventually took a step back as Guy led the organizations, serving as the primary messenger for St. Germain and other masters, including Jesus. The Ballard's believed in past lives with Ballard believing she was Elizabeth I and Joan of Arc in her past lives.

In 1939, Guy Ballard died and their son, Donald Ballard, became the leader of the I AM Movement. Prior to his father's death, Donald Ballard also served as a messenger per the wishes of St. Germain. However, both he and Ballard did not serve as primary messenger. Shortly thereafter, Ballard, Donald and other staff members were charged with mail fraud, with the charge being that the Movement was attempting to defraud mail recipients into joining a religion that was known to be false. Ballard was convicted twice, the second time after a ruling was overturned. The case went to the US Supreme Court and was ruled as United States v. Ballard.

Ballard eventually began serving as a messenger for St. Germain and other masters in the fifties and in the sixties she hosted a radio show.

Later life and legacy

Ballard died in February 1971 in Chicago. After her death, the Saint Germain Foundation and press were operated by the board of directors and select "appointed messengers". Additionally, no other movement members, including appointment messengers, have served as direct messengers of the masters, including St. Germain. During her role as messenger, Ballard left over 2,000 recordings of messages from St. Germain and the masters.

References

External links 
 Publications of the FBI Case  BALLARD, EDNA ANNE processed and released pursuant to the Freedom of Information Act (FOIA), a Document with all published pages of this case.

1886 births
1971 deaths
People from Burlington, Iowa
People from Chicago
American occultists
New Age spiritual leaders
Ascended Master Teachings
American harpists
Women harpists
20th-century women musicians
Founders of new religious movements
Female religious leaders